The Schepenhuis (Aldermen's House) of Mechelen is a building where the city's aldermen held their meetings in the Middle Ages. It is located on the edge of the Grote Markt, between the latter and the IJzerenleen and is considered the first stone 'town hall' of Flanders.

In the 13th century, Mechelen experienced an economic revival due to the flourishing cloth trade. As a result, the need for buildings grew. In 1288 it was decided to erect a stone building for the aldermen's bench, which until then met in the open air. The building was expanded between 1374 and 1375. The decoration was done by André Beauneveu and Jan van Mansdale, among others.

The interior includes a remarkable archive room on the ground floor. Previously called Vierschaere, it has a remarkable oak ceiling. In the interior there are 12 sculpted balkzolen created between 1375 and 1378 by Herman Van Blankene and Jan van Lokeren. The original furnishings have been preserved only in the 1374 wing. There are cross bracings supported by corbels of carved stone made by Jan I Keldermans (Mansdale) between 1377 and 1385. The original fireplace and a stone landing staircase were removed in 1772. On the above floor there is a library that was formerly the meeting room of the aldermen. The chimney is by Andries Keldermans, with a mantelpiece made by Frans Sanders in 1526. On the north wall there is a 16th-century fresco depicting the Crucifixion. The stairway tower dates from 1407.

During the reign of Charles the Bold, the  later known as Great Council of Mechelen was installed in the Schepenhuis in 1473. This was the highest court of law in the Netherlands. In 1477 it was abolished by Mary of Burgundy. In 1616 the council moved to the former palace of Margaret of Austria, also in Mechelen.

The building was later given various functions. For example, from 1811 to 1846 the city academy was housed here. From 1852 the building served as a municipal museum. On 1 November 1897 it was turned into a city archive and city library. The building was heavily damaged during the First World War. Several restoration campaigns followed, in 1916-1917, 1932 and 1934-1938. From 2000, the Schepenhuis served again as a museum. In 2011, an exhibition of works by Rik Wouters from the collection of the Royal Museum of Fine Arts opened, as the Antwerp museum was undergoing works of renovation. Until the end of these works in 2017, the Wouters collection remained in the Schepenhuis.

Since 9 September 2018, the Schepenhuis is the new location of the tourist information office "Visit and UiT in Mechelen".

References

Further reading
 M. EEMAN, H. KENNES en L. MONDELAERS, "Schepenhuis", Inventaris van het bouwkundig erfgoed, 2012.
 V. HERMANS, Ancienne maison échevinale ou vieux palais. Documents inédits, Mechelen, 1902.
 D. ROGGEN, "Het Beeldhouwwerk van het Mechels Schepenhuis", Gentse Bijdragen tot de Kunstgeschiedenis, 3 (1936), 86-103.
 M. VAN DER VENNET, "L'ancienne maison échevinale de Malines", Tijdschrift voor Oudheidkunde en Kunstgeschiedenis, 22 (1953), 3-32.

City and town halls in Belgium
Buildings and structures in Antwerp Province
Tourist attractions in Antwerp Province
Mechelen